LMBO or LmbO may refer to:
 Leveraged Management Buy-out, a management buyout that is also a leveraged buyout
 Laughing My Bones Off, an Internet slang expression related to LOL
 The LMBO group, a French venture capital company that indirectly funded the European e-commerce website Pixmania
 LmbO, a protein involved in the biosynthesis of Lincomycin
 Legion Merchandising and Branding Officer, a kind of leader in the 501st Legion, an international Star Wars fan organization
 Little Memphis Blues Orchestra, a band previously known as the "Taylor Hicks Band"

See also 
 Limbo, a part of the afterlife in Catholic theology
 LMAO (Laughing My Ass Off), another Internet slang expression